Beta-Lactamase Database also known as BLDB is a database that documents beta-lactamase structure and function. It is a comprehensive manually curated public resource. All of the enzymes reported and characterized in the literature are organised into their respective classes: A, B, C and D. They are also organised by family, and subfamily. Three-dimensional structures are also provided. Users can use BLAST searches to query to the database. BLDB is hosted on a cloud and is implemented in PHP on a Linux server under the CentOS 7.2 Operating system.

See also 
 Antimicrobial Resistance databases

References 

Biological databases